Walkow may refer to the following places in Poland:
Walków, Łódź Voivodeship (central Poland)
Wałków, Greater Poland Voivodeship (west-central Poland)